Women Behind Bars is a camp black comedy play by Tom Eyen, parodying the prison exploitation films produced by Universal, Warner Bros. and Republic Pictures during the 1950s.

Plot
Set in the Women's House of Detention in Greenwich Village, there is, among the range of women, an innocent young woman, a chain-smoking street-wise tough girl, and a delicate Southern belle reminiscent of Blanche DuBois. The innocent was framed by her husband on a charge of armed robbery, and is brutalized, betrayed and sexually assaulted throughout her eight-year sentence. She is ultimately broken by the system and leaves jail as a hard-edged, gum-chomping drug dealer. These women are overseen by the prison's sadistic matron and her henchman.

Productions

Original 1975 production
The original production at the off-Broadway Astor Place Theatre opened on May 1, 1975, featuring Pat Ast, Helen Hanft, Mary-Jennifer Mitchell and Sharon Barr. Alan Eichler was co-producer and press representative.

1976 revival
The play was revived in 1976 at the Truck and Warehouse Theatre in New York with Pink Flamingos star Divine as the matron. It quickly developed a cult following and became a success.

1977 London production
In 1977 the play, again starring Divine as the matron, had a successful run at the Whitehall Theatre in the West End of London. Fiona Richmond co-starred.

1983 revival
The play was revived once again in Los Angeles in 1983, directed by Ron Link and featuring Lu Leonard, Adrienne Barbeau and Sharon Barr. The LA production ran for almost a year, first at the Cast Theater and then moving to the Roxy Theatre. Sally Kellerman and Linda Blair later joined the cast.

2012 live reading
On May 7, 2012, The New Group presented a reading of the play, directed by Scott Elliott.

Cast
 Charles Busch as the matron
 Halley Feiffer as Mary-Eleanor
 Janeane Garofalo as Louise
 Nancy Giles as Jo-Jo
 Josh Hamilton as the men
 Natasha Lyonne as Cheri
 Cynthia Nixon as Blanche
 Rosie O'Donnell as Gloria
 Daphne Rubin-Vega as Guadalupe
 Rhea Perlman as Granny and The Warden
 Jennifer Tilly as Ada

2020 Revival
A large-scale revival played the Montalbán Theatre in Los Angeles in January, 2020, presented by Winbrook Productions and "Just Pow" Productions. The production was conceived and directed by Scott Thompson. A new title song and background score was composed by Fred Barton.

Cast
 Kathy Griffin, Host
 Traci Lords as Gloria
 Eureka O'Hara as the Matron
 Mink Stole as Granny and The Warden
 Miss Coco Peru as Louise
 Ginger Minj as Ada
 Chi Chi DeVayne as Jo-Jo
 Suzie Kennedy as Cheri
 Poppy Fields as Blanche
 Wesley Woods as The Men
 Adrienne Couper Smith as Mary-Eleanor
 Tatiana Monteiro as Guadalupe

Contemporary
Women Behind Bars continues to be produced by gay repertory companies, such as San Francisco's Theatre Rhinoceros.

Reception
The subtle lesbianism apparent in the original B movies is emphasized comedically throughout. The New York Times described the play as "an extraordinarily interesting work from one of America's most innovative and versatile playwrights."

Sequel
Eyen and Divine wrote a 1978 follow-up play called The Neon Woman, which was produced in New York and San Francisco.

References

External links
1984 New York Times review
Review of 2006 production
Article about New Group reading (2012)

1975 plays
American plays
Satirical plays
Fiction set in prison
Women's prisons in the United States